Pareuchaetes pseudoinsulata is a moth of the subfamily Arctiinae. It was described by Alfredo Rei do Régo Barros in 1956. It is found in Venezuela and Trinidad. It is an introduced species in Sri Lanka, as well as on Sabah, Borneo, Palawan and Guam.

Description
The wings and thorax, and abdomen are all yellow. Antennae of male bipectinated. Mid tibia clothed with very long hair. Forewings with both antemedial and postmedial tufts on inner margin.

Since C. odorata is an invasive species, P. pseudoinsulata has been used as a form of biological control.

References

Phaegopterina
Moths described in 1956
Insects of Trinidad and Tobago